Kladeruby is a municipality and village in Vsetín District in the Zlín Region of the Czech Republic. It has about 500 inhabitants.

History
The first written mention of Kladeruby is from 1141.

References

Villages in Vsetín District